South Island telegraph frog (Eleutherodactylus audanti) is a species of frog in the family Eleutherodactylidae endemic to Cuba. It occurs in the Massif de la Hotte and Massif de la Selle, Cuba, and in the Sierra de Baoruco, the Dominican Republic.

Etymology
The specific name audanti honors Dr. André Audant, a Cuban entomologist who, together with Thomas Barbour, collected the holotype .

Habitat and conservation
The species' natural habitats are upland closed-canopy forest and forest edges where it is found under rocks and debris. It is a moderately common species in suitable habitat but threatened by habitat loss.

References

audanti
Endemic fauna of Hispaniola
Amphibians of the Dominican Republic
Amphibians of Cuba
Amphibians described in 1934
Taxa named by Doris Mable Cochran
Taxonomy articles created by Polbot